Live is the first live album by 311. Recorded during the Transistor tour. The album was recorded on September 17, 1997 at the UNO Lakefront Arena in New Orleans, Louisiana.

Track listing

References

311 (band) live albums
1998 live albums
Capricorn Records live albums